Cheever Racing was an auto racing team founded in 1996 by Eddie Cheever as Team Cheever in the Indy Racing League IndyCar Series. They fielded a car for Cheever for much of its existence, but occasionally ran two cars, almost always for the Indianapolis 500. The team won the 1998 Indianapolis 500 with Cheever driving and then switched to Infiniti engines and gained sponsorship from Excite for 2000. The team continued to be moderately successful and gained Infiniti's first series win. When Infiniti left the series in 2003 the team, which by then was sponsored by Red Bull switched to Chevrolet engines and then switched to Toyota in 2005, after Chevrolet's departure. Despite some of the most talented drivers in the league, a long string of bad luck and underpowered engines rendered the team little more than mid-pack. With no sponsor for the 2006 season, Eddie decided to trim the team to a single car and return to the cockpit as both a cost-cutting move and to seize the opportunity to return to racing before he felt he got too old to be competitive. Cheever only committed to drive until the Indianapolis 500 but continued until the 8th race of the season. The IRL operation shut down after the Kansas Speedway race when it could not find a sponsor or pay driver to continue.

Cheever Racing also ran a Daytona Prototype car in the Grand-Am Rolex Sports Car Series. In 2007 Cheever purchased the intellectual property rights to the Fabcar chassis and has renewed its development and begun offering the chassis to other teams in the series. The car was subsequently renamed the Coyote chassis, in tribute to the racing cars built in the 1970s by A. J. Foyt Enterprises.  Cheever Racing did not field any entries for the 2009 Rolex 24 at Daytona.

In 2006, Cheever also founded an Indy Pro Series team. In 2006 its car was driven by Chris Festa. Their driver for the 2007 season was Richard Antinucci, Eddie's nephew, who captured two wins on a part-time schedule.

Drivers who have driven for Cheever

IRL IndyCar Series
 Alex Barron (2003–2005)
 Ed Carpenter (2004)
 Patrick Carpentier (2005)
 Eddie Cheever (1996–2002, 2006)
 Tomáš Enge (2006)
 Wim Eyckmans (1999)
 Scott Goodyear (2001)
 Robby McGehee (2002)
 Max Papis (2002, 2006)
 Buddy Rice (2002–2003)
 Tomas Scheckter (2002)
 Robby Unser (1998)
 Jeff Ward (1997)

Indy Pro Series
 Richard Antinucci (2007)
 Chris Festa (2006)

Grand Am
 Fabio Babini (2008)
 Matteo Bobbi (2008)
 Harrison Brix (2007)
 Patrick Carpentier (2006)
 Eddie Cheever (2006–2007)
 Emmanuel Collard (2007)
 Tommy Erdos (2007–2008)
 Christian Fittipaldi (2006–2008)
 Antonio García (2008)
 Stefan Johansson (2006)
 Tom Kimber-Smith (2008)
 Lucas Luhr (2006)
 Sascha Maassen (2007)
 Scott Mayer (2008)
 Mike Newton (2007–2008)
 Hoover Orsi (2006)
 Stephane Ortelli (2008)
 Brent Sherman (2008)

Racing results

Complete IRL IndyCar Series results
(key)

 The 1999 VisionAire 500K at Charlotte was cancelled after 79 laps due to spectator fatalities.

Complete Indy Pro Series results
(key)

IndyCar wins

References 

IndyCar Series teams
Indy Lights teams
Grand American Road Racing Association teams
American auto racing teams
Red Bull sports teams